Briga Superiore is a  of the  of Messina in the Province of Messina, Sicily, southern Italy. It stands at an elevation of 50 metres above sea level. At the time of the Istat census of 2001 it had 215 inhabitants.

The frazione suffered heavily in the mudslides which devastated the area in 2009.

References

Frazioni of the Metropolitan City of Messina